Christopher Johnson (born 29 May 1960) is a former professional rugby league footballer who played in the 1980s and 1990s. He played at representative level for Great Britain, and at club level for Leigh (Heritage № 929), and Swinton, as a goal-kicking .

Playing career

International honours
Johnson won a cap for Great Britain while at Leigh in 1985 against France.

Club records
Johnson hold Leigh's "Most Goals In A Season" record, with 173 goals scored in the 1985-86 season, and he is 5th on Leigh's "Most Points In A Career" list with 1073 points, behind; John Woods (2492 points), Jimmy Ledgard (2194 points), Martyn Ridyard (1797 points), and Neil Turley (1519 points).

References

1960 births
Living people
English rugby league players
Great Britain national rugby league team players
People educated at Bishop Vesey's Grammar School
Leigh Leopards players
Place of birth missing (living people)
Rugby league fullbacks
Swinton Lions players
Blackpool Borough players
Liverpool City (rugby league) players